Rush(es) may refer to:

Places

United States
 Rush, Colorado
 Rush, Kentucky
 Rush, New York
 Rush City, Minnesota
 Rush Creek (Kishwaukee River tributary), Illinois
 Rush Creek (Marin County, California), a stream
 Rush Creek (Mono County, California), on the eastern slope of the Sierra Nevada, running into Mono Lake
 Rush County, Indiana
 Rush County, Kansas
 Rush Historic District, a zinc mining region in the Ozark Mountains of Arkansas
 Rush Lake (disambiguation), various lakes
 Rush Street (Chicago), Illinois
 Rush Township (disambiguation), various places
 Rush Valley, Utah

Elsewhere
 Rush, Dublin, a small seaside town in Fingal, Ireland
 Rush Glacier in Brabant Island, Antarctica
 Rush Peak in the Karakoram range, Pakistan

People
 Rush (name), a list of people with either the surname or given name
 Rush (League of Legends player) (born 1993), from South Korea
 Rush (wrestler) (born 1988), ring name of Mexican professional wrestler William Muñoz
 Rush or Georges St-Pierre (born 1981), Canadian mixed martial artist

Arts, entertainment, and media

Fictional characters
 Rush, a robotic dog from the Megaman universe
 Nicholas Rush, a character in the television series Stargate Universe
 William Rush, protagonist in the Time Crisis 4 video game
Rush, an entity from the Roblox game Doors

Films
 Rushes or dailies, the first print made of a day's filming
 Rush (1983 film), a science fiction film directed by Anthony Richmond
 Rush (1991 film), a crime film directed by Lili Fini Zanuck
 Rush (2012 film), a Bollywood thriller film directed by Shamin Desai
 Rush (2013 film), a  film about Formula 1 directed by Ron Howard
 Rush (2019 film), a Sri Lankan action thriller film directed by Mahesh Munasingh

Gaming
 Rush (video game series), an arcade racing series
 L.A. Rush, the fourth installment of the Rush series
 Rush (video gaming), an attack strategy
 Kinect Rush: A Disney•Pixar Adventure, a game for Windows 10 and Xbox by Pixar

Music

Bands and albums
 Rush (band), a Canadian progressive rock band
 Rush (Rush album), their 1974 debut album
 Rush (Anna Abreu album), 2011
 Rush (Bel Canto album), 1998
 Rush (Darude album), a 2003 trance album
 Rush (Dean Geyer album), a 2007 pop album
 Rush (EP), by Monsta X, 2015
 Rushes (album), a 1998 ambient electronic album by The Fireman
 Rush (soundtrack), the soundtrack for the 1991 film
 Rush (2013 soundtrack), from the film of the same name
 Rush!, a 2023 album by Måneskin

Songs
 "Rush" (Aly & AJ song), a 2005 pop song
 "Rush" (Ayra Starr song), 2022
 "Rush" (Big Audio Dynamite II song), a 1991 alternative dance song
 "Rush" (Lewis Capaldi song), 2018
 "Rush" (The Pillows song), a 1999 Japanese-rock song
 "Rush" (Poisonblack song), a 2006 goth-rock song
 "Rush" (William Singe song), 2017
 "Rush", a 1993 song by Depeche Mode on Songs of Faith and Devotion
 "Rush", a song by Uverworld from the album Timeless
 "Rush", a 2005 song by MYMP on Beyond Acoustic
 "Rush", a 2005 song by Rihanna from the album Music of the Sun
 "The Rush", a 1991 song by Luther Vandross
 "Rushes" (song), Darius Danesh's second single from his debut album Dive In
 "Rush Rush" (Debbie Harry song), 1983 song
 "Rush Rush" (Paula Abdul song), 1991 Paula Abdul song

Television
 Rush (1974 TV series), a 1974 Australian historical drama
 Rush (2008 TV series), a 2008 Australian police drama
 Rush TV (2009 TV series), a 2009 Australian music and fashion show
 Rush (Kenyan TV series), a 2014 Kenyan sitcom-soap opera
 Rush (American TV series), a 2014 American medical drama
 "Rush" (The X-Files), an episode of The X-Files
 Rush (TV channel), a New Zealand TV channel
 9Rush, an Australian TV channel

Education
 Rush University, Chicago, Illinois
 Rush Medical College, its medical school

Plants
 Rush (botanical disambiguation)
 Rushes, grass-like plants in the Juncaceae family
 Sweet rush, Acorus calamus, an aromatic grass-like plant unrelated to the Juncaceae

Ships
 , a United States Coast Guard high endurance cutter
 , four revenue cutters of the United States Revenue Marine (1790–1894) and United States Revenue Cutter Service (1894–1915)
 , the name of two United States Navy ships

Sports
 Rush (Australian rules football), a tactic in Australian rules football
 Rush (gridiron football), a tactic in American football
 Rush, in croquet, a roquet whose aim is to move the target ball a significant distance
 Chicago Rush, an Arena Football League team
 Denver Rush, an American women's gridiron football team
 Saskatchewan Rush, a National Lacrosse League team

Other uses
 Gold rush, a fervor which arises when new unclaimed deposits of gold ore are discovered
 Rush (psychology), an acute transcendent state of euphoria
 Rush (Thorpe Park), a giant swing ride at Thorpe Park in Chertsey, Surrey, England
 Rush week, period for joining many fraternities and sororities
 Rushes (company), a post-production and visual effects company based in London
 Toyota Rush, a version of the Daihatsu Terios mini sport utility vehicle marketed in Japan, Indonesia, Malaysia and Latin America
 Rush Enterprises, American commercial vehicle dealer
 Rush, an Thai men's lifestyle magazine

See also
 
 
 Rusch, surname